Mokoia is a small settlement in south Taranaki, in the western North Island of New Zealand. It is located on State Highway 3,  to the east of Hāwera and about 17 km northwest of Patea.

History and culture

Mokoia is close to the site of Taiporohenui, a wharenui constructed in the 1850s between the Tangahoe and Manawapou rivers. The structure was 27.6 metres long and 9.2 metres wide, which at the time was one of the largest wharenui ever built in New Zealand.

The settlement of Mokoia was founded in 1867. Early settlers farmed sheep, cattle and horses. A flour mill was run by local Māori. A creamery was built in 1904 and expanded into a dairy factory in 1908. It expanded to include cheese-making in 1913, and again to produce casein in 1923, and closed in 1970.

A meteorite exploded above Mokoia on 26 November 1908, showering the area with fragments. It made international headlines. Two large fragments were recovered from the farm of Cecil Hawken by the Curator of the Wanganui Public Museum, George Marriner, and pieces taken from these are now held in collections all over the world.

Mokoia was one of the areas where soldiers were given rehab farms after World War II.

The Rimu A1 well struck oil on the coast near Mokoia in December 1999, and eight more wells for oil and natural gas were subsequently developed by Swift Petroleum. The Rimu Production Station opened in 2002.

Marae

The Mokoia Marae and meeting house is a meeting place for the Ngāti Ruanui hapū of Ngā Ariki.

Education

Mokoia School is a coeducational contributing primary (years 1–6) school with a decile rating of 7 and a roll of 22. The first school in the area was built in 1904, but was replaced by the current school in the early 1940s.

References

South Taranaki District
Populated places in Taranaki